The 2007 Canadian National Challenge Cup was hosted in Halifax, NS.  This competition is officially called the Hyundai Challenge Cup, for sponsorship reasons.  It was won by the Calgary Callies.

Teams/Rosters

British Columbia:Columbus Clan FC

 Alberta:Calgary Callies

 Saskatchewan: Yorkton United

 Manitoba:

 Ontario: Woodbridge Italia

 Quebec: SC Panellinios Montréal

 New Brunswick:

 Prince Edward Island:

Nova Scotia: Halifax City Coldwell Banker

Newfoundland and Labrador:St. Lawrence Laurentians

Results

Qualification
The teams qualify by the various Provincial competitions.

Ontario
Woodbridge Italia defeated Erin Mills Eagles 2–1 on 16 September 2007 to claim the Ontario Cup.

Nova Scotia
The top 4 teams from the Nova Scotia Soccer League (excluding the teams from PEI and NB) competed in the Final 4 to determine the representative for the Canadian National Challenge Cup.

References

 Laurentians claim two more national soccer medals – Sports – The Southern Gazette

2007
Canadian National Challenge Cup
Nat